Kim Jae-Ryong (born 25 April 1966) is a retired South Korean long-distance runner who specialized in the marathon.

Achievements

Personal bests
Marathon - 2:09.30 hours (1992)

References

1966 births
Living people
South Korean male long-distance runners
Athletes (track and field) at the 1992 Summer Olympics
Olympic athletes of South Korea
Asian Games medalists in athletics (track and field)
Athletes (track and field) at the 1990 Asian Games
Athletes (track and field) at the 1994 Asian Games
South Korean male marathon runners
Asian Games silver medalists for South Korea
Asian Games bronze medalists for South Korea
Medalists at the 1990 Asian Games
Medalists at the 1994 Asian Games
20th-century South Korean people